Gobetti is an Italian surname. Notable people with the surname include:

Ada Gobetti (1902–1968), Italian teacher, journalist and anti-fascist
Giuseppe Gobetti (born 1909), Italian footballer
Piero Gobetti (1901–1926), Italian journalist, intellectual and anti-fascist

Italian-language surnames